The 2017 Liga 3 Bangka Belitung season is the third edition of Liga 3 Bangka Belitung is a qualifying round of the 2017 Liga 3. PS Beltim are the defending champions.

Teams
Liga 3 Bangka Belitung will be followed by six clubs namely PS Basel (South Bangka), PS Banteng (Central Bangka), Persibel Belitung, PS Beltim (East Belitung), PS Bangka Selection, and Belitong F.C.

League table

Champions

References

2017 in Indonesian football
Bangka Belitung Islands